1,4-Dichlorobutane is a chloroalkane with the molecular formula . It is one of several structural isomers of dichlorobutane. They are all colorless liquids of low flammabiltity and of interest for specialized synthetic uses.

Preparation and reactions
1,4-Dichlorobutane can be obtained from 1,4-butanediol as well as from tetrahydrofuran.

1,4-Dihalobutanes are well suited for the synthesis of 5-membered ring heterocyces. For example, treatment with sodium sulfide gives tetrahydrothiophene. Treatment with lithium wire gives 1,4-dilithiobutane.

1,4-Dichlorobutane can be used, among others, as a precursor for nylon 6,6 (via adiponitrile).

References

Chloroalkanes